Piz Nair is a mountain in the Sesvenna Alps, located north of the Fuorn Pass in the canton of Graubünden.

The mountain is part of the Swiss National Park.

References

External links

 Piz Nair on Hikr

Mountains of Graubünden
Mountains of the Alps
Alpine three-thousanders
Mountains of Switzerland
Val Müstair
Zernez